Laura Gallego García (born in Quart de Poblet, Valencia (Spain) on 11 October 1977) is a Spanish author of young adult literature.

Biography 
Laura Gallego García was born in Quart de Poblet, Valencia, on 11 October 1977. She is a Spanish novelist of children and juvenile literature, specializing in the fantasy genre. She studied Hispanic Philology at the University of Valencia.

Professional career 
At age 11, she started writing ‘Zodiaccía, a different world’. She spent ten years finishing it and, although it has never been published, she has a special affection for this story. Then, she was sure about being a novelist and she sent her  work to several literary contests for years.

At the age of 21, after finishing high school, she decided to study Hispanic Philology in the University of Valencia. She continued sending her  work to publishing houses and contests but she did not publish anything until she wrote ‘Finis Mundi’, which was the first book she published. Previously, she wrote 13 books but none of them were brought to light. With ‘Finis Mundi’, the novelist won the  ‘Barco de Vapor’ Prize in 1999 after having participated for several years. This contest is celebrated every year by SM publishing house.

After the publishing of her story 'Finis Mundi', she continued with other stories such as 'Mandrágora' or the tetralogy of 'Crónicas de la Torre'. However, although her fame is mainly due to her juvenile novel, she has also published stories aimed at children.

In 2002, she  won this contest again, this time  with her novel ‘La leyenda del rey errante’. In collaboration with SM publishing house, she has also published ‘El coleccionista de relojes extraordinarios’, the trilogy of ‘Memorias de Idhún’, ‘Donde los árboles cantan’, ‘Dos velas para el diablo’, the saga of ‘Crónicas de la Torre’ and ‘Las hijas de Tara’, this last one  as part of the collection “Gran Angular”.

In 2004, she started publishing her second trilogy, called ‘Memorias de Idhún’ (Memorias de Idhún I: La Resistencia, Memorias de Idhún II: Tríada, Memorias de Idhún III: Panteón). This was her biggest success, with more than 750 000  copies sold.

She founded the university magazine ‘Náyade’, which was distributed by the Faculty of Philology  at the University of Valencia. She was the co-director from 1997 to 2010.

Afterwards, she has published several independent books, most of them in  the fantasy genre, as well as the second part of ‘Alas de fuego’, entitled ‘Alas negras’. She has also entered the realist literature with the serie «Sara y las goleadoras», which includes titles such as: ‘Creando equipo’, ‘Las chicas somos guerreras’, ‘Goleadoras en la liga’, ‘El fútbol y el amor son incompatibles’, ‘Las Goleadoras no se rinden’ and ‘El último gol’. Her novel ‘Donde los árboles cantan’, published in October 2011, won the ‘Premio Nacional de Literatura Infantil y Juvenil’ in 2012. Also, she has won the ‘Cervantes Chico’ Prize. That same year, she returned to children's literature with ‘Mago por casualidad’.

In March 2017, she published ‘Por una rosa’, a book that contains three stories written by three different novelists: Laura Gallego, Javier Ruescas and Benito Taibo. These are three stories set in the universe of the classic tale ‘Beauty and the Beast’.

Thematic style and characteristic 

She has explored  many of the literary subjects: she began with historical- fantasy literature with her story ‘Finis Mundi but also science-fiction with her story ‘Las hijas de Tara’. Later, she wrote about epic fantasy. This type of literature was reflected in her story ’Memorias de Idhún’. She has also written stories for children.

In her  fantasy narrative, particularly with ‘Memorias de Idhún’, the  theme of love is just as or more important than the fantasy theme. The characters constantly express their feelings, doubts, misgivings, disappointment, etc., and are guided by them, generally more so  other concepts such as honour or duty. This is what most differentiates her from novelists like Tolkien. Thus, reflection on one's own feeling occupies a lot of the space in the dialogues and the reproduction of thought. This fact is favoured by the decision to employ a passionate love triangle in his story ‘Memorias de Idhún’. She is inspired by some elements from the work of some novelists such as Margaret Weis and Tracy Hickman, particularly from their stories ‘La espada de Joram’, ‘Dragonlance’ and ‘El ciclo de la puerta de la muerte’.

Books

Her books have been translated into a multitude of languages: Catalan, Romanian, French, Polish, Danish, Swedish, Norwegian, Hungarian, English, Italian, German, Portuguese, Korean and Chinese.
 1999: Finis Mundi (Barco de Vapor Award, 1999) 
 2000: El Valle de los Lobos 
 2002: La maldición del Maestro 
 2003: La llamada de los muertos
 2004: Fenris, el elfo 
 2004: Memorias de Idhún I: La Resistencia 
 2005: Memorias de Idhún II: Tríada 
 2006: Memorias de Idhún III: Panteón
 2009: Sara y las goleadoras: Las chicas somos guerreras
 2009: Sara y las goleadoras: Goleadoras en la liga
 2010: Sara y las goleadoras: El fútbol y el amor son incompatibles
 2010: Sara y las goleadoras: Las goleadoras no se rinden
 2010: Sara y las goleadoras: El último gol
 2001: El cartero de los sueños
 2001: Retorno a la Isla Blanca
 2002: Las hijas de Tara   
 2002: La leyenda del rey errante (Barco de Vapor Award, 2001)	 
 2003: Mandrágora 	 
 2003: ¿Dónde está Alba? 	
 2004: El coleccionista de relojes extraordinarios 
 2004: Alas de fuego 	 
 2004: La hija de la noche 	
 2004: Max ya no hace reír 
 2004: Alba tiene una amiga muy especial	
 2005: El fantasma en apuros 	
 2007: La emperatriz de los Etéreos 	
 2008: Dos velas para el diablo 
 2009: Alas negras
 2011: Dónde los árboles cantan
 2012: Mago por casualidad
 2013: El Libro de los Portales
 2014: Enciclopedia de Idhún
 2015: Todas las Hadas del Reino
 2015: Héroes por casualidad
 2016: Omnia: todo lo que puedas soñar
 2017: Cuando me veas
 2017: Por una rosa
 2018: Guardianes de la Ciudadela: El bestiario de Axlin
2018: Guardianes de la Ciudadela: El secreto de Xein
2018: Guardianes de la Ciudadela: La misión de Rox

Awards 
The major prize the novelist has received is the ‘Premio Nacional de Literatura Infantil y Juvenil’ in 2012 with her fantasy-epic story ‘Dónde los árboles cantan’. This award, endowed with 20,000 euros, was given by the Ministry of Education, Culture and Sport. This award meant that her story was the best book in children's  or juvenile literature published in 2011 in any of the official languages spoken in Spain.

Likewise, in 2011, she was awarded with the ‘Premio Cervantes Chico’ Prize  by the City Hall of Alcalá de Henares and the ‘Asociación de Libreros y Papeleros’.  She was also awarded with the ‘Premio de Literatura Infantil El Barco de Vapor’ twice. First, in 1999, with her story ‘Finis Mundi’ and then, in 2002, with her story ‘La leyenda del rey errante’. She also received the  ‘Imaginamalaga 2013’ Prize  with her story ‘El libro de los portales’, and also the ‘Kelvin 505’ Prize in 2016.

References

External links 
Laura Gallego's official site

1977 births
Living people
People from Horta Oest
Writers from the Valencian Community
Spanish children's writers
Spanish women children's writers
Spanish fantasy writers